Bravelands is a children's novel series written by a team of authors under the pseudonym Erin Hunter. The series has overall been well received, with critics praising the realistic behavior of the characters, the excitement in the novels, and the description of the Bravelands, though also criticizing it for its similarities to The Lion King.

Summary 
The story of Bravelands takes place in Africa. The animals Of Africa live through coexistence by one rule: only kill to survive. The protagonist varies from chapter to chapter, and the set of protagonists varies from arc to arc.

Books

Bravelands
The series follows the adventures of three animals: Fearless, a lion who was cast out of his pride, Thorn, a baboon who tries to rebel against his destiny, and Sky, an elephant gifted with the ability to read bones.

Broken Pride - 6 June 2017

Code of Honor - 6 February 2018

Blood and Bone - 2 October 2018

Shifting Shadows - 7 May 2019

The Spirit-Eaters - 4 February 2020

Oathkeeper - 22 September 2020

Bravelands: Curse of the Sandtongues 
This series follows three different animals: a gorilla with a deadly secret, a leopard struck by tragedy, and a gazelle cast out of her herd.

Shadows on the Mountain - 18 May 2021

The Venom Spreads - 1 February 2022

Blood on the Plains - 4 October 2022

Bravelands: Thunder on the Plains 
This series follows a water buffalo who leads his herd, a cheetah harboring deadly secrets, and a hyena trying to find peace between her clan and a pride of lions.

The Shattered Horn - 2 May 2023

Critical reception
The first book in the Bravelands series, Broken Pride appeared on The New York Times Best Seller list. School Library Journal criticizes the series for its similarities to the Lion King but writes, "Fans of Hunter's previous series will not be disappointed, and they will be anxious for the next installment in this new series." Kirkus Reviews gave it a starred review and writes, "Deep characters, a complex plot, rich mythology, and a stunning setting all come together to prove once again that the Hunter collective are master storytellers. Fans of Warriors will thrill at the opportunity to travel from the forest to the savanna in this brand new series."

References

External links
Official Website
 https://www.harpercollins.com/9780062642141/bravelands-4-shifting-shadows/

Book series introduced in 2017
Fantasy novel series
Series of children's books
Novels by Erin Hunter
HarperCollins books
Books about lions
Books about elephants
Novels set in Africa